Kavita Goyat (born 15 August 1988) is a female boxer from India. She competes in 69–75 kg weight category. Kavita won the bronze medal at the 2010 Asian Games held in Guangzhou, China. She lost 1:3 to Jinzi Li of China in the semi finals of the Asian Games in 2010

Boxing career
Kavita Goyat's present coach is Anoop Kumar. She was earlier being coached by Raj Singh.

During her 6th Nations Cup in the Serbian city in 2017, Kavita Goyat got injured during the semi-finals, due to which she had to settle for the third place. Kavita has previously won gold medal at Hanoi Asian Indoor Games, 2009 in 64 kg category along with Mary Kom. Along with this she has won several national titles.

Championships and other accomplishments 
Kavita Goyat has won numerous gold, silver, and bronze medals at various championships.

Gold medals 

 Hanoi Asian Indoor Games (2009)
11th Senior Women National Boxing Championship (2010)
 12th Senior Women National Boxing Championship (2011)
 4th Inter-Zonal Women National Boxing Championship (2012)
 11th Senior Women Haryana State Boxing Championship (2010)
 12th Senior Women Haryana State Boxing Championship (2011)
 14th Senior Women Haryana State Boxing Championship (2015)

Silver medals 

 9th Senior Women National Boxing Championship (2008)
 Federation Cup Women Boxing Championship (2009)
 10th Senior Women National Boxing Championship (2009)
 13th Senior Women National Boxing Championships (2012)
 16th Senior(Elite) Women National Boxing Championship (2015)

Bronze medals 

 14th Senior Women Boxing Competition (2013)
Asian Games (2010)
N.C Sharma Memorial Federation Cup Women Boxing Championship (2009)

Personal life 
She was born in Haryana, to Om Prakash and Smitra Devi. Her hobbies include playing games and studying.

References 

Indian women boxers
Living people
Sportswomen from Haryana
1988 births
Asian Games medalists in boxing
Boxers at the 2010 Asian Games
Asian Games bronze medalists for India
Medalists at the 2010 Asian Games
Boxers from Haryana
Light-middleweight boxers
21st-century Indian women